The Frederick Prentiss House was a historic house in Columbus, Ohio, United States. The house was built in 1890 and was listed on the National Register of Historic Places in 1986. The Frederick Prentiss House was built at a time when East Broad Street was a tree-lined avenue featuring the most ornate houses in Columbus; the house reflected the character of the area at the time.

The house was built in 1890 and designed with Italianate and Queen Anne influences. It was built for Frederick Prentiss, president of the Hayden-Clinton National Bank. His family occupied the house until 1938.

See also
 List of demolished buildings and structures in Columbus, Ohio
 National Register of Historic Places listings in Columbus, Ohio

References

Houses completed in 1890
National Register of Historic Places in Columbus, Ohio
Houses in Columbus, Ohio
Houses on the National Register of Historic Places in Ohio
Demolished buildings and structures in Columbus, Ohio
King-Lincoln Bronzeville
Broad Street (Columbus, Ohio)